Gunta Vaičule (née Latiševa-Čudare; born 9 March 1995) is a Latvian sprinter specialising in the 400 metres. She represented her country at the 2015 World Championships in Beijing. Her personal best in the event is 51.37 seconds set in London in 2017.

International competitions

References

External links
 

1995 births
Living people
Latvian female sprinters
World Athletics Championships athletes for Latvia
People from Rēzekne
Athletes (track and field) at the 2016 Summer Olympics
Olympic athletes of Latvia
Universiade medalists in athletics (track and field)
Universiade silver medalists for Latvia
Competitors at the 2019 Summer Universiade
Medalists at the 2017 Summer Universiade
European Games competitors for Latvia
Athletes (track and field) at the 2019 European Games
20th-century Latvian women
21st-century Latvian women